The Bresler–Pister yield criterion is a function that was originally devised to predict the strength of concrete under multiaxial stress states.  This yield criterion is an extension of the Drucker–Prager yield criterion and can be expressed on terms of the stress invariants as

Yield criteria of this form have also been used for polypropylene and polymeric foams.

The parameters  have to be chosen with care for reasonably shaped yield surfaces.

{| class="toccolours collapsible collapsed" width="60%" style="text-align:left"
!Derivation of expressions for parameters A, B, C
|-
|The Bresler–Pister yield criterion in terms of the principal stresses  is

If  is the yield stress in uniaxial tension, then

If  is the yield stress in uniaxial compression, then

If  is the yield stress in equibiaxial compression, then

|}

Alternative forms of the Bresler-Pister yield criterion 
In terms of the equivalent stress and the mean stress, the Bresler–Pister yield criterion can be written as

The Etse-Willam form of the Bresler–Pister yield criterion for concrete can be expressed as

The GAZT yield criterion for plastic collapse of foams also has a form similar to the Bresler–Pister yield criterion and can be expressed as

References

See also 
Yield surface
Yield (engineering)
Plasticity (physics)

Plasticity (physics)
Solid mechanics
Yield criteria